Volodymyr Korobka (born 7 July 1989) is a Ukrainian footballer.

Career
He joined Tavriya in July 2008 during the summer transfer season. Korobka is the product of Dnipro youth school.

In January 2015 Korobka left FC Tyumen.

References

External links

1989 births
Living people
Footballers from Dnipro
Ukrainian footballers
Ukrainian Premier League players
Ukrainian First League players
Russian First League players
Erovnuli Liga players
Belarusian Premier League players
Ukrainian expatriate footballers
Expatriate footballers in Russia
Expatriate footballers in Belarus
Expatriate footballers in Georgia (country)
FC Dnipro players
SC Tavriya Simferopol players
FC Metalurh Zaporizhzhia players
FC Volgar Astrakhan players
FC Tyumen players
FC Vitebsk players
FC Kolkheti-1913 Poti players
Ukrainian expatriate sportspeople in Russia
Ukrainian expatriate sportspeople in Belarus
Ukrainian expatriate sportspeople in Georgia (country)
Association football midfielders
FC Torpedo Kutaisi players
FC Volyn Lutsk players
FC Inhulets Petrove players
FC Metalist 1925 Kharkiv players
FC Kramatorsk players